Akpujiogu is an Igbo town in Orumba South Local Government Area of Anambra State in southeastern Nigeria. Often referred to as just "Akpu", the town's geographical coordinates lie within 6” 02’46 North and 7” 12’36 East. It shares boundaries with Ajalli, Ufuma, Nawfija, Ogboji, and Ndiowu.

History 
Two popular legends trace the town’s origin: the first to Akpugoeze in Enugu State, the second unearthing subtle connections to Nri. In the aftermath of the 1902 British invasion of Arochukwu, Akpujiogu had rented land to Aro refugees, most of whom had fled from the British, others of whom had been living in their midst, all settler groups constituting today the towns of Ndiokolo, Ndiokpalaeke, and Ajalli. Neighbouring towns had also rented land to the Aro, acts which were codified in an agreement in 1911. This generosity made possible the colonial establishments in the section rented to Ajalli: a court in 1907, a post office in 1909, and a government school in 1911. In addition to Aro tenant communities, Akpujiogu is also home to the Saint Dominic Savio Catholic Seminary, sited on a hillock where, in 1904-5, the colonial authorities had conducted, as part of the Pax Britannica, a dane-gun-breaking exercise, due to which the hillock came to be called Ugwuntijiegbe – Igbo for “The Hillock Where Guns Are Broken”.

Landmarks 

The town is famed for several historical landmarks, especially in religion. A major stronghold of Roman Catholicism since 1911, its Saint Matthew Church was elevated to parish status in 1945, making it the second oldest in the present Catholic Diocese of Awka. The first parish priest there was the Blessed Iwene Michael Tansi, so far Nigeria’s only beatified person. In the town, a school bears his name: the Father Tansi Memorial Secondary School. Further located in the town is a National Gallery of Art: the Ufesiodo Heritage Centre, named after the nickname of the geographical expanse of Orumba South and North local government areas, a nickname stemming from the presence of the mysterious Odo River. Ufesiodo is Igbo for “Across the Odo River”. 

The town comprises fifteen villages: Ihebuebu, Mgboko, Ohemmiri, Okparaebutere, Uhuana, Umuanaga, Umudiana, Umuezeagu, Umuezeakpu, Umuezechukwu, Umuezeilo, Umuihu, Umuikpa, Umuokpara, and Upata. Their major river is the Aghommiri River, a tributary of the Mamu River, which in itself is a tributary of the Anambra River.

Notable people 
The immediate past Member of the House of Representatives for Orumba South and North Constituency in the Nigerian National Assembly, Honourable Ben Nwankwo, hails from the town, as did the late High Chief Ebenezer Onuigbo, a foremost multi-millionaire business tycoon in the 1960s and 1970s. High Chief Sir Cyril Sunday Eze, President General Igbo Speaking Community in Lagos State, is also a prominent Son of Akpu in Orumba South lga.

Akpu Day is their annual celebration on 26 December.

References

 http://www.vanguardngr.com/2015/05/2-anambra-communities-bicker-over-exclusion-from-proposed-lga/
 https://web.archive.org/web/20160817015640/http://anambrariansnews.com.ng/?p=10579

Towns in Anambra State
Populated places in Igboland